The November 1982 Irish general election to the 24th Dáil was held on Wednesday, 24 November, three weeks after the dissolution of the 23rd Dáil on 4 November by President Patrick Hillery, on the request of Taoiseach Charles Haughey following a defeat of the government in a motion of confidence. The general election took place in 41 Dáil constituencies throughout Ireland for 166 seats in Dáil Éireann, the house of representatives of the Oireachtas.

The 24th Dáil met at Leinster House on 14 December to nominate the Taoiseach for appointment by the president and to approve the appointment of a new government of Ireland. Garret FitzGerald was appointed Taoiseach, forming the 19th Government of Ireland, a coalition government of Fine Gael and the Labour Party.

Campaign
The second general election of 1982 took place just nine months after the election in February of the same year. There had never before been three general elections within eighteen months.

The general election was caused by the loss of support of the Independent TD Tony Gregory and the Workers' Party for the Fianna Fáil government. This was due to the government introducing substantial budget cuts, which the left-wing Teachta Dála (TDs) would not support. While economic issues dominated the campaign, the parties were weary of having to fight yet another general election.

Result

|}

Independents include Independent Fianna Fáil (7,997 votes, 1 seat).

Voting summary

Seats summary

Government formation
Fine Gael and the Labour Party formed the 19th Government of Ireland, a majority coalition.

Fine Gael recorded its best election result until 2011, coming within five seats of Fianna Fáil; at other times (such as 1977) Fianna Fáil had been twice as big as Fine Gael. The Labour Party had a new leader with Dick Spring. A programme for government was quickly drawn up and Garret FitzGerald of Fine Gael became Taoiseach for the second time. The poor showing for Fianna Fáil resulted in a leadership challenge to Charles Haughey by his opponents within the party. Haughey won the vote of confidence and remained as leader.

Dáil membership changes
The following changes took place as a result of the election:
5 outgoing TDs retired
1 vacant seat at election time
159 outgoing TDs stood for re-election (also John O'Connell, the outgoing Ceann Comhairle who was automatically returned)
138 of those were re-elected
21 failed to be re-elected
27 successor TDs were elected
18 were elected for the first time
9 had previously been TDs
There were 6 successor female TDs, increasing the total by 6 to 14.
There were changes in 22 of the 41 constituencies contested

Where more than one change took place in a constituency the concept of successor is an approximation for presentation only.

See also
Members of the 24th Dáil
Government of the 24th Dáil

Notes

References

External links
November 1982 election: Party leaders' debate RTÉ archives

Further reading

Irish general election, 1982b
1982 in Irish politics
1982b
24th Dáil
November 1982 events in Europe
1982 elections in the Republic of Ireland